is a Japanese writer, illustrator and translator from Tokyo, Japan. She is the author of 3 official children's books, on which the most notable were The Story of Cherry the Pig and Buzzy the Honeybee. She also owns a tea shop named Karel Capek located in Kokubunji, Tokyo. She is married in Tokyo with her husband and two sons.

Career
Utako was born in 1963 in Nagoya, Aichi Prefecture. After graduating in the Ritsumeikan University's Department of Sociology in Kyoto, she moved to Kokubunji, Tokyo, in 1987 and opened her tea shop, Karel Capek which is named after a Czech writer. At the time she is planning on selecting and blending tea, doing recipes and sweet packages, she became active on illustrating and writing stories and creating characters, some of them are based on her real life experiences. In 2002, she opened the Karel Capek Sweets shop in Kichijoji, which focuses on tea and sweets. She also worked on designing products for tea and tea accessories.

Utako had created 3 official children's books published in Japan, one which is translated in English. She also translated some of the Winnie the Pooh storybooks in Japanese and write various recipe books regarding tea and sweets. Utako also collaborated with Sanrio to make merchandise and tea-related goods based on the Wish me mell series.

Major works
 (November 2003, Bunka Shuppan Kyoku) 
 (2002, FELISSIMO) 
 (November 2001, FELISSIMO) 
 (November 2001, FELISSIMO) 
 (November 2001, FELISSIMO) 
 (November 1998, Media Factory) 
 (February 1999, Bunka Shuppan Kyoku) 
 (October 2001, Shufutoseikatsusha) 
 (September 2002, Kaiseisha. Translated and Published in English by Barnes & Noble) 
 (October 2003, Kaiseisha) 
 (October 2006, Kaiseisha)

References

External links
 Karel Capek Official Site
 Utako's Official Blog

1963 births
Living people
English–Japanese translators
Japanese writers
Japanese children's writers
Japanese women children's writers
20th-century Japanese women writers
21st-century Japanese women writers
Japanese translators
People from Nagoya
Ritsumeikan University